Bela Bajaria (born 1970 in the London Borough of Brent) is an Indian-American businesswoman and media executive. She joined Netflix in 2016 to oversee unscripted and scripted series. Bajaria is currently the Chief Content Officer.

Early life and education 
Bajaria was born in London, England, to parents of Indian descent and spent her time in London and Zambia. In the 1970s, when Bajaria was 4, her parents moved from London to the United States' West Coast with her brother to explore business opportunities. However, her parents overstayed their visas and became illegal immigrants, resulting in her being raised by her grandparents until they could legally obtain residency. Upon joining her parents in the United States in 1978, she enrolled in the local Los Angeles public schools during a time when it was "not cool to be Indian." As a teenager, she was enrolled at Torrance High School and Rolling Hills High School while working as a cashier.

Upon graduating high school, Bajaria was encouraged to enter the beauty pageants by a friend. She subsequently won the Miss LA India contest, Miss India USA, and was eventually crowned Miss India Worldwide 1991. Bajaria graduated from California State University, Long Beach in 1995 with her Bachelor of Arts communications degree from their College of Liberal Arts.

Career 
Upon graduating from university, Bajaria accepted a position with CBS in 1996 as an assistant in the movies and miniseries department. As an assistant, she read all of the scripts and spent hours in CBS' basement videotape library studying old films. She left CBS shortly for a management position at Warner Bros. Television Studios but returned in 1997 as a director. After the January 2002 departure of longtime CBS Movies and Miniseries senior vice president Sunta Izzicupo, under whom she had worked since the mid-'90s, Bajaria was promoted to vice president and then senior vice president of the department. When Television films began to decline, she requested a move to CBS' production studio to develop cable shows. She joined Universal Television as executive vice president in 2011 and shortly thereafter became president of the studio.

Bajaria joined Netflix in 2016 as head of unscripted and scripted content. In the same year, she was ranked 43rd on Fortune's Most Powerful Women list. In 2019, she began leading all local language series. In 2020, she was promoted to the role of global head of television for Netflix.

In December 2022, she was named to The Hollywood Reporter's Women in Entertainment Power 100.

Personal life 
Bajaria and her husband, writer-producer Doug Prochilo, have three children together: two daughters and one son.

On May 4, 2021, the Chicago Red Stars of the National Women's Soccer League announced that Bajaria had joined the women's soccer team's ownership group.

Accolades 
2022 – Time 100 Most Influential People
2022 – The Hollywood Reporter's Women in Entertainment Power 100
2016 – 43rd on Fortune's Most Powerful Women list

References 

1971 births
21st-century American businesspeople
21st-century American businesswomen
American people of Indian descent
British people of Indian descent
California State University, Long Beach alumni
CBS executives
Chicago Red Stars owners
Indian beauty pageant winners
Living people
Netflix people
People from the London Borough of Brent
Warner Bros. people